Muhammad Manzoor (born 21 January 1953) is a Pakistani weightlifter. He competed in the men's bantamweight event at the 1976 Summer Olympics.

References

1953 births
Living people
Pakistani male weightlifters
Olympic weightlifters of Pakistan
Weightlifters at the 1976 Summer Olympics
Place of birth missing (living people)
Asian Games medalists in weightlifting
Asian Games bronze medalists for Pakistan
Weightlifters at the 1974 Asian Games
Weightlifters at the 1978 Asian Games
Medalists at the 1978 Asian Games
20th-century Pakistani people